NV Hotel Mijn de Boer (more popularly called by Hotel de Boer, now Inna Dharma Deli Hotel) is a Dutch colonial style hotel located on the Cremerweg (now Jalan Balai Kota), Medan, Dutch East Indies, current-day Indonesia. The hotel was built in 1898 by Workum native and Dutch businessman Aeint Herman de Boer.

De Boer migrated to Dutch East Indies in late nineteenth century. First, he settled in Surabaya and became a part proprietor of a restaurant in Surabaya. In 1809, he migrated to Medan and began his new business. In early 1898, he built Hotel De Boer which just cointaned a restaurant, a bar, and seven rooms. In 1909, de Boer expanded his hotel by adding 40 rooms. In 1930, Hotel De Boer was expanded by adding 120 rooms and a huge hall.

In colonial times, this hotel was once inhabited by guests of honor of the Dutch Empire government like King Leopold II of Belgium and Prince Friedrich Christian of Schaumburg-Lippe (nephew of Queen Wilhelmina of the Netherlands), and also Dutch Frisian famous spy Mata Hari. Sutan Sjahrir, the first Prime Minister of Indonesia had ever been a violinist in this hotel during his school years in Medan.

Gallery

See also
List of colonial buildings in Medan

Cited Works

References

Hotels in Indonesia